In geometry, Dini's surface is a surface with constant negative curvature that can be created by twisting a pseudosphere. It is named after Ulisse Dini and described by the following parametric equations:
 

Another description is a generalized helicoid constructed from the tractrix.

See also 
Breather surface

References 

Surfaces of constant negative curvature